Goa People's Congress (GPC) is a splinter group of the Indian National Congress in Goa. GPC broke away from INC in 2000 under the leadership of Francisco Sardinha.

GPC formed a coalition government in the state together with Bharatiya Janata Party with Sardinha as Chief Minister. That government lasted nine months. After having broken relations to GPC, BJP continued to govern with support form other Congress dissidents. After the fall of the Sardinha cabinet two GPC members of the legislative assembly, led by Dayanand Narvekar, broke away and formed a parallel GPC.

Sardinha's GPC merged with Indian National Congress on April 5, 2001. Narvekar's GPC merged with INC August 27 the same year.

List of Chief Minister 

 Francisco Sardinha
 First term: 24 November 1999 to 23 October 2000

See also

Indian National Congress breakaway parties

Notes

Defunct political parties in Goa
2000 establishments in Goa
Indian National Congress breakaway groups
Political parties established in 2000
Political parties disestablished in 2001